The Hopman Cup XXXI was the 31st and final edition of the Hopman Cup tournament between nations in men's and women's tennis that took place at the Perth Arena in Perth, Western Australia.

On 26 June 2018, the defending Swiss team of Roger Federer and Belinda Bencic and 2018 finalist German team of Alexander Zverev and Angelique Kerber were announced as the first teams for the 2019 tournament. On 15 August 2018, the teams of Greece and Spain were announced.

For the first time in history, Roger Federer and Serena Williams faced each other in a competitive event. Federer came out victorious alongside Bencic in the mixed doubles rubber. This match also attracted a Perth Arena record tennis crowd of 14,064, which was the highest attendance for a tennis match in Western Australian history.

Switzerland successfully defended their title, beating Germany in a repeat of the previous year's final. This was Federer's 3rd Hopman Cup title, the most by any player, male or female.

Entrants

Seeds
The draw took place on 3 October 2018 and it placed the 8 teams into two groups, according to the following ranking-based seedings:

Alternated

Group stage

Group A

Standings

All times are local (UTC+8).

Australia vs. France

Germany vs. Spain

France vs. Germany

Australia vs. Spain

Spain vs. France

American Whitney Osuigwe played instead of Garbiñe Muguruza due to her withdrawal due to injury. Scores counted as a 4–0, 4–0 win for the French mixed pair.

Australia vs. Germany

Group B

Standings

All times are local (UTC+8).

Great Britain vs. Greece

Great Britain vs. Switzerland

United States vs. Greece

United States vs. Switzerland

Great Britain vs. United States

Greece vs. Switzerland

Final

Germany vs. Switzerland

References

External links
 

2019 in Australian tennis
2019
2019 in tennis
December 2018 sports events in Australia
January 2019 sports events in Australia